Helma Seitz (23 February 1913 – 11 July 1995) was a German actress. She appeared in twenty-six films and television shows between 1962 and 1988.

Selected filmography
 Escape from East Berlin (1962)
  (1967, TV miniseries)
  (1968, TV miniseries)
 Alexander Zwo (1972–1973, TV miniseries)
 Fabian (1980)

References

External links

1913 births
1995 deaths
German film actresses
People from Offenbach am Main